Mikhail Ivanovich Avilov (September 6, 1882, Saint Petersburg – April 14, 1954, Leningrad) was a Russian Empire and Soviet painter and art educator, who lived and worked in Leningrad, a member of the Leningrad Union of Soviet Artists, professor of the Repin Institute of Arts, Stalin Prize winner, People's Artist of the Russian Federation, regarded as one of the brightest representatives of Soviet Art, who played an important role in the formation of the Leningrad School of Painting. He is mostly known for his battle paintings.

Biography 
Mikhail Ivanovich Avilov was born on September 6, 1882 in Saint Petersburg. From 1893-1903, he studied in the Drawing School of the Imperial Society for the Encouragement of the Arts, then in the private studio of the artist, Leon Dmitriev-Kavkazsky. From 1904-1910, Avilov studied at the Imperial Academy of Arts as a pupil of Franz Roubaud and Mykola Samokysh. From 1908, he began to participate in art exhibitions.

Mikhail Avilov fought in the First World War. After the October Revolution of 1917, Avilov taught at the School of Drawing Society for the Encouragement of Arts in Petrograd, then in the College of Industrial Art and in the Academy of Arts. From 1923, Avilov was an exhibitor at the AKhRR. In 1932, he was one of the founders of the Leningrad Union of Soviet Artists.

In 1943, Avilov was awarded the Stalin Prize in the first degree for his battle painting «Duel Peresvet with Chelubey at the Kulikovo Field». He was also awarded the Order of the Red Banner of Labour. In 1953, Avilov was awarded the honorary title of a People's Artist of the Russian Federation. He was a Member of the Academy of Arts of the USSR.

Mikhail Ivanovich Avilov died on April 14, 1954 in the seventy-second year of his life. He was buried in the Nikolskoye Cemetery in the grounds of the Alexander Nevsky Lavra in Leningrad. His paintings are found in the Russian Museum, the Tretyakov Gallery, and in art museums and private collections in Russia, Ukraine, Japan, China, France, England and other countries.

Pupils 
 Vsevolod Bazhenov
 Mikhail Kaneev
 Tatiana Kopnina
 Boris Lavrenko
 Alexander Pushnin
 Galina Smirnova
 Mikhail Tkachev
 and others.

See also

 Fine Art of Leningrad
 Leningrad School of Painting
 List of 20th-century Russian painters
 List of painters of Saint Petersburg Union of Artists
 Saint Petersburg Union of Artists

References

Sources 
 Бродский В. Михаил Иванович Авилов. М., Советский художник, 1956.
 Двести лет Академии художеств СССР. Каталог выставки. Л-М., Искусство, 1958. С.213.
 Государственный Русский музей. Живопись. Первая половина ХХ века. Каталог. А—В. Т.8. СПб., Palace Edition, 1997. С.17-18.
 Художники народов СССР. Биобиблиографический словарь. Т. 1. М., Искусство, 1970. С.42-43.
 Sergei V. Ivanov. Unknown Socialist Realism. The Leningrad School. Saint Petersburg, NP-Print Edition, 2007. P.12, 13, 19, 356, 361-363, 367, 370, 371, 378-385, 388, 390, 392, 395, 447. , .

External links 
 
 

1882 births
1954 deaths
People from Sankt-Peterburgsky Uyezd
Painters from the Russian Empire
Soviet painters
Socialist realist artists
Leningrad School artists
Members of the Leningrad Union of Artists
Russian military personnel of World War I
People's Artists of the RSFSR (visual arts)
Stalin Prize winners
Recipients of the Order of the Red Banner of Labour
Burials at Tikhvin Cemetery